Nigel Coan is a British animator, director, and writer best known for his contributions to the television series The Mighty Boosh and Noel Fielding's Luxury Comedy as well as the film Bunny and the Bull. Coan first met Noel Fielding and fellow Boosh actor Dave Brown at Buckinghamshire Chilterns University College (now Buckinghamshire New University), where they lived and attended art school together. Along with his partner Ivana Zorn and their production company Nipple, Coan has produced work for companies such as Canon, Volvo, and Honda. 

Coan was responsible mainly for the animated sequences in The Mighty Boosh. With the Luxury Comedy series he not only contributes animation but shares in the writing and directs episodes as well. He also directed the music video 'Can't Wait For Christmas' by The Loose Tapestries featuring Noel Fielding and Serge Pizzorno.

References

External links

Website of Coan's production company, Nipple

British animators
British animated film directors
The Mighty Boosh
Living people
Place of birth missing (living people)
Year of birth missing (living people)